Events from the year 2005 in Russia.

Incumbents
 President: Vladimir Putin
 Prime Minister: Mikhail Fradkov

Events
 January 1: Monetization of in-kind benefits
 January 15: 2005 Dagestan Raids
 March 17: Assassination attempt of Anatoly Chubais. Vladimir Kvachkov was charged for the crime, but was acquitted by a jury.
 May 25: 2005 Moscow power blackouts
 June 4: Borozdinovskaya operation
 July 1: Makhachkala Rus bombing
 July 1: King's Gate in Kaliningrad reopens after renovation, marking city's 750th anniversary.
 August 24–30: 1000th Anniversary of Kazan celebrations.
 August 27: Kazan Metro opens
 August 29: TatNeft Arena opens
 September 27: Chief Rabbi of Moscow Pinchas Goldschmidt expelled from Russia during passport control at Domodedovo airport. The incident is related to the conflict between the Jewish community of Moscow and the Russian Jewish Congress.
 October 1: the first meeting of the Civic Chamber of Russia
 October 3: White Army general Anton Denikin and philosopher Ivan Ilyin reburied in the Donskoy Monastery necropolis
 October 13–14: 2005 Nalchik raid
 November 4: the first National Unity Day celebration in Russia. Also, the first Russian March took place on 4 November 2005 and was the first legal far-right mass meeting in modern Russian history.
 November 17: launch of Blue Stream gas pipeline
 December 1: Komi-Permyak Autonomous Okrug merged with Perm Oblast to form Perm Krai.
 December 4: 2005 Moscow City Duma election
 December 10: Russia Today begin its broadcast

Births

Notable deaths

January

January 1 – Dmitry Nelyubin, 33, Russian cyclist, murdered.
January 15 – Leonid Brekhovskikh, 87, Russian scientist.

February

February 2 – Magomed Omarov, Russian politician, deputy Interior Minister of Dagestan.
February 6 – Lazar Berman, 74, Russian classical pianist.
February 9 – Sergei Hackel, 83, British Russian Orthodox priest, theologian and broadcaster.
February 11 – Vladimir Kotelnikov, electrical engineer

March

March 8 – Aslan Maskhadov, president of the breakaway Chechen Republic of Ichkeria

May

May 15 – Natalya Gundareva, 56, Russian actress, stroke.

July

July 20 – Nikolay Aksyonenko, 56, former chief of the Russian Railways

August

August 6 – Valentin Nikulin, 73, actor
August 7 – Mikhail Yevdokimov, 47, Russian comedian and politician, car accident.
August 29 – Nikolai Bakhvalov, mathematician

September

September 20 – Yuri Aizenshpis, music manager and producer
September 21 – Mustai Karim, Bashkir poet
September 30 – Sergei Starostin, historical linguist

October

October 13 – Ilyas Gorchkhanov, North Caucasus warlord
October 14 – Oleg Lundstrem, composer and conductor
October 18 – Alexander Yakovlev, Soviet politician
October 26 – Margarita Nazarova, circus performer and actress

November

November 19 – Karen Ter-Martirosian, theoretical physicist
November 25 – Polina Gelman, WWII flight navigator

December

December 5 – Vladimir Toporov, philologist
December 26 – Viktor Stepanov, actor

See also
List of Russian films of 2005

References

External links

 
Years of the 21st century in Russia
2000s in Russia